Nick Cassidy (born 19 August 1994) is a New Zealand racing driver, currently competing in Formula E for Envision Racing, and in the World Endurance Championship and Deutsche Tourenwagen Masters with AF Corse. He has won the 2017 championship in Super GT and the 2019 championship in Super Formula.

Career

Nick Cassidy began his racing career in Karting when he was just six years old and remained in Karting till 2010. He participated in midget races from the age of eight.

Cassidy has been racing in the formula racing series since 2008. After driving in Formula First championships, he started racing in the Formula Ford championships in New Zealand and Australia. In 2009, Cassidy was runner-up in the New Zealand Formula First Championship, and in 2010, he was runner-up in the New Zealand Formula Ford Championship. Both times, he was named Rookie of the year.

In 2011, Cassidy began the year for Giles Motorsport, in the Toyota Racing Series. After five podium finishes, he won two of three races on the last race weekend. He was named Rookie of the year and runner-up, behind his teammate Mitch Evans.

Cassidy started a few races in the Australian Formula Ford Championship, such as the ADAC Formel Masters and the Formula Abarth. He competed in five races in the Fujitsu V8 Supercar Series. In 2012, Cassidy participated in the Toyota Racing Series again, remaining with Giles Motorsport. In two consecutive weeks of 2018, Cassidy lost final-round title battles in both Super Formula and Super GT, finishing second in both series. 

In 2019, he completed the 'triple crown' in Japanese motorsport by winning the Super Formula title. He made his Formula E debut in the 2020–21 Formula E season for Envision Virgin Racing, replacing Sam Bird. He also made his debut in the Deutsche Tourenwagen Masters for a combined entry of AF Corse and Red Bull Racing, replacing Red Bull Racing Reserve Driver Alex Albon in the final round of the 2021 season at the Norisring. He is piloting Red Bull's Ferrari 488 GT3s for the 2022 season.

Karting record

Karting career summary

Racing record

Racing career summary 

† As Cassidy was a guest driver, he was ineligible to score championship points.

Complete New Zealand Grand Prix results

Complete Macau Grand Prix results

Complete FIA Formula 3 European Championship results
(key)

† As Cassidy was a guest driver, he was ineligible to score championship points.

Complete Super GT results
(key) (Races in bold indicate pole position) (Races in italics indicate fastest lap)

Complete Super Formula results
(key) (Races in bold indicate pole position) (Races in italics indicate fastest lap)

‡ Half points awarded as less than 75% of race distance was completed.

Complete IMSA SportsCar Championship results
(key) (Races in bold indicate pole position; results in italics indicate fastest lap)

Complete Deutsche Tourenwagen Masters results
(key) (Races in bold indicate pole position) (Races in italics indicate fastest lap)

† As Cassidy was a guest driver, he was ineligible to score championship points.

Complete Formula E results
(key) (Races in bold indicate pole position; races in italics indicate fastest lap)

Complete FIA World Endurance Championship results
(key) (Races in bold indicate pole position; races in italics indicate fastest lap)

Complete 24 Hours of Le Mans results

References

External links

 
 

1994 births
Living people
Sportspeople from Auckland
New Zealand racing drivers
Formula Ford drivers
Toyota Racing Series drivers
ADAC Formel Masters drivers
Formula Abarth drivers
Formula Renault Eurocup drivers
FIA Formula 3 European Championship drivers
V8SuperTourer drivers
Formula Renault 2.0 Alps drivers
Japanese Formula 3 Championship drivers
Super GT drivers
Super Formula drivers
24 Hours of Daytona drivers
Formula E drivers
ma-con Motorsport drivers
Fortec Motorsport drivers
EuroInternational drivers
Carlin racing drivers
Koiranen GP drivers
T-Sport drivers
TOM'S drivers
Prema Powerteam drivers
Kondō Racing drivers
Eurasia Motorsport drivers
Toyota Gazoo Racing drivers
Envision Virgin Racing drivers
AF Corse drivers
24 Hours of Le Mans drivers
Deutsche Tourenwagen Masters drivers
Blancpain Endurance Series drivers
WeatherTech SportsCar Championship drivers
Asian Le Mans Series drivers
FIA World Endurance Championship drivers
M2 Competition drivers
AV Formula drivers
24H Series drivers